Roki may refer to:

People 
 Roki (musician) (born 1985), Zimbabwean musician
 Nikša Roki (born 1988), Croatian swimmer
 Rōki Sasaki (born 2001), Japanese baseball player

Other uses 
 Röki, 2020 adventure video game
 Roki Spa, an army of mercenaries in the Kingdom of Georgia
 Roki Tunnel, a mountain tunnel in Georgia and Russia
 RoKi Naiset, a Finnish ice hockey team
 Rovaniemen Kiekko (RoKi), a Finnish ice hockey team